The leopard fringe-fingered lizard (Acanthodactylus pardalis), also known commonly as the Egyptian fringe-fingered lizard, is a species of lizard in the family Lacertidae. The species is endemic to North Africa.

Geographic range
A. pardalis is found in Egypt and Libya.

Habitat
The natural habitats of the leopard fringe-fingered lizard are subtropical or tropical dry shrubland, subtropical or tropical dry lowland grassland, and intertidal flats.

Reproduction
A. pardalis is oviparous.

Conservation status
A. pardalis is threatened by habitat loss.

References

Further reading
Boulenger GA (1887). Catalogue of the Lizards in the British Museum (Natural History). Second Edition. Volume III. Lacertidæ ... London: Trustees of the British Museum (Natural History). (Taylor and Francis, printers). xii + 575 pp. + Plates I-XL. (Acanthodactylus pardalis, new combination, pp. 65–67).
Lichtenstein H (1823). Verzeichniss der Doubletten des zoologischen Museums der Königl. Universität zu Berlin nebst Beschreibung vieler bisher unbekannter Arten von Säugethieren, Vögeln, Amphibien und Fischen. Berlin: T.Trautwein. x + 118 pp. + one plate. (Lacerta pardalis, new species, p. 99). (in German and Latin).
Salvador, Alfredo (1982). "A revision of the lizards of the genus Acanthodactylus (Sauria: Lacertidae)". Bonner Zoologischen Monographien (16): 1–167. (Acanthodactylus pardalis, pp. 80–84, Figures 39–41, Map 16). (in English, with an abstract in German).
Sindaco, Roberto; Jeremčenko, Valery K. (2008). The Reptiles of the Western Palearctic: 1. Annotated Checklist and Distributional Atlas of the Turtles, Crocodiles, Amphisbaenians and Lizards of Europe, North Africa, Middle East and Central Asia. (Monographs of the Societas Herpetologica Italica). Latina, Italy: Edizioni Belvedere. 580 pp. .

Acanthodactylus
Lacertid lizards of Africa
Vertebrates of Egypt
Reptiles described in 1823
Taxa named by Hinrich Lichtenstein
Taxonomy articles created by Polbot
Reptiles of North Africa